The men's 100 metres event at the 1990 Commonwealth Games was held on 27 and 28 January at the Mount Smart Stadium in Auckland.

Medalists

Results

Heats
Qualification: First 5 of each heat (Q) and the next 6 fastest (q) qualified for the quarterfinals.

Wind:Heat 1: +0.9 m/s, Heat 2: +1.3 m/s, Heat 3: +2.1 m/s, Heat 4: +3.9 m/s, Heat 5: +2.0 m/s, Heat 6: +3.8 m/s

Quarterfinals
Qualification: First 4 of each heat (Q) and the next 2 fastest (q) qualified for the semifinals.

Wind:Heat 1: +3.5 m/s, Heat 2: +1.2 m/s, Heat 3: +3.0 m/s, Heat 4: -1.1 m/s

Semifinals
Qualification: First 4 of each heat (Q) and the next 1 fastest (q) qualified for the final.

Wind:Heat 1: +3.5 m/s, Heat 2: +1.3 m/s

Final
Wind: +3.9 m/s

References

100
1990